The women's 100 metres event at the 2007 Summer Universiade was held on 10–11 August.

Medalists

Results

Heats
Qualification: First 4 of each heat (Q) and the next 4 fastest (q) qualified for the quarterfinals.

Wind:Heat 1: -1.2 m/s, Heat 2: -0.6 m/s, Heat 3: -0.3 m/s, Heat 4: -0.8 m/s, Heat 5: -2.0 m/s, Heat 6: -0.4 m/s, Heat 7: -1.8 m/s

Quarterfinals
Qualification: First 4 of each heat qualified directly (Q) for the semifinals.

Wind:Heat 1: -0.9 m/s, Heat 2: -0.3 m/s, Heat 3: -0.5 m/s, Heat 4: -1.4 m/s

Semifinals
Qualification: First 4 of each semifinal qualified directly (Q) for the final.

Wind:Heat 1: -2.0 m/s, Heat 2: -1.9 m/s

Final
Wind: -0.8 m/s

References
Results

100
2007 in women's athletics
2007